Crime Fighters Inc. were a short-lived Australian group, that released two singles.

Discography

Singles

References

1989 establishments in Australia
1990 disestablishments in Australia
Musical groups established in 1989
Musical groups disestablished in 1990